The stomach is a muscular, hollow organ in the gastrointestinal tract of humans and many other animals, including several invertebrates. The stomach has a dilated structure and functions as a vital organ in the digestive system. The stomach is involved in the gastric phase of digestion, following chewing. It performs a chemical breakdown by means of enzymes and hydrochloric acid.

In humans and many other animals, the stomach is located between the esophagus and the small intestine. The stomach secretes digestive enzymes and gastric acid to aid in food digestion. The pyloric sphincter controls the passage of partially digested food (chyme) from the stomach into the duodenum, where peristalsis takes over to move this through the rest of intestines.

Structure
In the human digestive system, the stomach lies between the esophagus and the duodenum (the first part of the small intestine). It is in the left upper quadrant of the abdominal cavity. The top of the stomach lies against the diaphragm. Lying behind the stomach is the pancreas. A large double fold of visceral peritoneum called the greater omentum hangs down from the greater curvature of the stomach. Two sphincters keep the contents of the stomach contained; the lower esophageal sphincter  (found in the cardiac region), at the junction of the esophagus and stomach, and the pyloric sphincter at the junction of the stomach with the duodenum.

The stomach is surrounded by parasympathetic (stimulant) and sympathetic (inhibitor) plexuses (networks of blood vessels and nerves in the anterior gastric, posterior, superior and inferior, celiac and myenteric), which regulate both the secretory activity of the stomach and the motor (motion) activity of its muscles.

Because it is a distensible organ, it normally expands to hold about one litre of food. The stomach of a newborn human baby will only be able to retain about 30 millilitres. The maximum stomach volume in adults is between 2 and 4 litres.

Sections 

In classical anatomy the human stomach is divided into four sections, beginning at the cardia.
 The cardia is where the contents of the esophagus empty into the stomach.
 The fundus is formed in the upper curved part.
 The body is the main, central region of the stomach.
 The pylorus is the lower section of the stomach that empties contents into the duodenum.

The cardia is defined as the region following the "z-line" of the gastroesophageal junction, the point at which the epithelium changes from stratified squamous to columnar. Near the cardia is the lower esophageal sphincter. Research has shown that the cardia is not an anatomically distinct region of the stomach but a region of the esophageal lining damaged by reflux.

Anatomical proximity 
The stomach bed refers to the structures upon which the  stomach rests in mammals. These include the tail of the pancreas, splenic artery, left kidney, left suprarenal gland, transverse colon and its mesocolon, and the left crus of diaphragm, and the left colic flexure. The term was introduced around 1896 by Philip Polson of the Catholic University School of Medicine, Dublin. However this was brought into disrepute by surgeon anatomist J Massey.

Blood supply 

The lesser curvature of the human stomach is supplied by the right gastric artery inferiorly and the left gastric artery superiorly, which also supplies the cardiac region. The greater curvature is supplied by the right gastroepiploic artery inferiorly and the left gastroepiploic artery superiorly. The fundus of the stomach, and also the upper portion of the greater curvature, is supplied by the short gastric arteries, which arise from the splenic artery.

Microanatomy

Wall

Like the other parts of the gastrointestinal tract, the human stomach walls consist of a mucosa, submucosa, muscularis externa, subserosa and serosa.

The inner part of the lining of the stomach, the gastric mucosa, consists of an outer layer of column-shaped cells, a lamina propria, and a thin layer of smooth muscle called the muscularis mucosa. Beneath the mucosa lies the submucosa, consisting of fibrous connective tissue. Meissner's plexus is in this layer interior to the oblique muscle layer.

Outside of the submucosa lies another muscular layer, the muscularis externa. It consists of three layers of muscular fibres, with fibres lying at angles to each other. These are the inner oblique, middle circular, and outer longitudinal layers. The presence of the inner oblique layer is distinct from other parts of the gastrointestinal tract, which do not possess this layer. Stomach contains the thickest muscularis layer consisting of three layers, thus maximum peristalsis occurs here.
 The inner oblique layer: This layer is responsible for creating the motion that churns and physically breaks down the food. It is the only layer of the three which is not seen in other parts of the digestive system. The antrum has thicker skin cells in its walls and performs more forceful contractions than the fundus.
 The middle circular layer: At this layer, the pylorus is surrounded by a thick circular muscular wall, which is normally tonically constricted, forming a functional (if not anatomically discrete) pyloric sphincter, which controls the movement of chyme into the duodenum. This layer is concentric to the longitudinal axis of the stomach.
 Auerbach's plexus (myenteric plexus) is found between the outer longitudinal and the middle circular layer and is responsible for the innervation of both (causing peristalsis and mixing).

The outer longitudinal layer is responsible for moving the bolus towards the pylorus of the stomach through muscular shortening.

To the outside of the muscularis externa lies a serosa, consisting of layers of connective tissue continuous with the peritoneum.

Glands

The mucosa lining the stomach is lined with a number of these pits, which receive gastric juice, secreted by between 2 and 7 gastric glands. Gastric juice is an acidic fluid containing hydrochloric acid and the digestive enzyme pepsin. The glands contains a number of cells, with the function of the glands changing depending on their position within the stomach.

Within the body and fundus of the stomach lie the fundic glands. In general, these glands are lined by column-shaped cells that secrete a protective layer of mucus and bicarbonate. Additional cells present include parietal cells that secrete hydrochloric acid and intrinsic factor, chief cells that secrete pepsinogen (this is a precursor to pepsin- the highly acidic environment converts the pepsinogen to pepsin), and neuroendocrine cells that secrete serotonin.

Glands differ where the stomach meets the esophagus and near the pylorus. Near the junction between the stomach and the esophagus lie cardiac glands, which primarily secrete mucus. They are fewer in number than the other gastric glands and are more shallowly positioned in the mucosa. There are two kinds - either simple tubular with short ducts  or  compound racemose resembling the duodenal Brunner's glands. Near the pylorus lie pyloric glands located in the antrum of the pylorus. They secrete mucus, as well as gastrin produced by their G cells.

Gene and protein expression 

About 20,000 protein coding genes are expressed in human cells and nearly 70% of these genes are expressed in the normal stomach. Just over 150 of these genes are more specifically expressed in the stomach compared to other organs, with only some 20 genes being highly specific. The corresponding specific proteins expressed in stomach are mainly involved in creating a suitable environment for handling the digestion of food for uptake of nutrients. Highly stomach-specific proteins include GKN1, expressed in the mucosa; pepsinogen PGC and the lipase LIPF, expressed in chief cells; and gastric ATPase ATP4A and gastric intrinsic factor GIF, expressed in parietal cells.

Development
In early human embryogenesis, the ventral part of the embryo abuts the yolk sac. During the third week of development, as the embryo grows, it begins to surround parts of the sac. The enveloped portions form the basis for the adult gastrointestinal tract. The sac is surrounded by a network of vitelline arteries and veins. Over time, these arteries consolidate into the three main arteries that supply the developing gastrointestinal tract: the celiac artery, superior mesenteric artery, and inferior mesenteric artery. The areas supplied by these arteries are used to define the foregut, midgut, and hindgut. The surrounded sac becomes the primitive gut. Sections of this gut begin to differentiate into the organs of the gastrointestinal tract, and the esophagus, and stomach form from the foregut.

Function

Digestion

In the human digestive system, a bolus (a small rounded mass of chewed up food) enters the stomach through the esophagus via the lower esophageal sphincter. The stomach releases proteases (protein-digesting enzymes such as pepsin) and hydrochloric acid, which kills or inhibits bacteria and provides the acidic pH of 2 for the proteases to work. Food is churned by the stomach through muscular contractions of the wall called peristalsis – reducing the volume of the bolus, before looping around the fundus and the body of stomach as the boluses are converted into chyme (partially digested food). Chyme slowly passes through the pyloric sphincter and into the duodenum of the small intestine, where the extraction of nutrients begins.

Gastric juice in the stomach also contains pepsinogen. Hydrochloric acid activates this inactive form of enzyme into the active form, pepsin. Pepsin breaks down proteins into polypeptides.

Absorption 
Although the absorption in the human digestive system is mainly a function of the small intestine, some absorption of certain small molecules nevertheless does occur in the stomach through its lining. This includes:
 Water, if the body is dehydrated
 Medication, such as aspirin
 Amino acids
 10–20% of ingested ethanol (e.g. from alcoholic beverages)
 Caffeine
 To a small extent water-soluble vitamins (most are absorbed in the small intestine)

The parietal cells of the human stomach are responsible for producing intrinsic factor, which is necessary for the absorption of vitamin B12. B12 is used in cellular metabolism and is necessary for the production of red blood cells, and the functioning of the nervous system.

Control of secretion and motility 

Chyme from the stomach is slowly released into the duodenum through coordinated peristalsis and opening of the pyloric sphincter. The movement and the flow of chemicals into the stomach are controlled by both the autonomic nervous system and by the various digestive hormones of the digestive system:

Other than gastrin, these hormones all act to turn off the stomach action. This is in response to food products in the liver and gall bladder, which have not yet been absorbed. The stomach needs to push food into the small intestine only when the intestine is not busy. While the intestine is full and still digesting food, the stomach acts as storage for food.

Other
Effects of EGF
Epidermal growth factor (EGF) results in cellular proliferation, differentiation, and survival.  EGF is a low-molecular-weight polypeptide first purified from the mouse submandibular gland, but since then found in many human tissues including the submandibular gland, and the parotid gland. Salivary EGF, which also seems to be regulated by dietary inorganic iodine, also plays an important physiological role in the maintenance of oro-esophageal and gastric tissue integrity. The biological effects of salivary EGF include healing of oral and gastroesophageal ulcers, inhibition of gastric acid secretion, stimulation of DNA synthesis, and mucosal protection from intraluminal injurious factors such as gastric acid, bile acids, pepsin, and trypsin and from physical, chemical, and bacterial agents.

Stomach as nutrition sensor
The human stomach can "taste" sodium glutamate using glutamate receptors and this information is passed to the lateral hypothalamus and limbic system in the brain as a palatability signal through the vagus nerve. The stomach can also sense, independently of tongue and oral taste receptors, glucose, carbohydrates,  proteins, and fats. This allows the brain to link nutritional value of foods to their tastes.

Thyrogastric syndrome  
This syndrome defines the association between thyroid disease and chronic gastritis, which was first described in the 1960s. This term was coined also to indicate the presence of thyroid autoantibodies or autoimmune thyroid disease in patients with pernicious anemia, a late clinical stage of atrophic gastritis. In 1993, a more complete investigation on the stomach and thyroid was published, reporting that the thyroid is, embryogenetically and  phylogenetically, derived from a primitive stomach, and that the thyroid cells, such as primitive gastroenteric cells, migrated and specialized in uptake of iodide and in storage and elaboration of iodine compounds during vertebrate evolution. In fact, the stomach and thyroid share iodine-concentrating ability and many morphological and functional similarities, such as cell polarity and apical microvilli, similar organ-specific antigens and associated autoimmune diseases, secretion of glycoproteins (thyroglobulin and mucin) and peptide hormones, the digesting and readsorbing ability, and lastly, similar ability to form iodotyrosines by peroxidase activity, where iodide acts as an electron donor in the presence of H2O2. In the following years,  many researchers published reviews about this syndrome.

Clinical significance

Diseases

A series of radiographs can be used to examine the stomach for various disorders. This will often include the use of a barium swallow. Another method of examination of the stomach, is the use of an endoscope. A gastric emptying study is considered the gold standard to assess the gastric emptying rate.

A large number of studies have indicated that most cases of peptic ulcers, and gastritis, in humans are caused by Helicobacter pylori infection, and an association has been seen with the development of stomach cancer.

A stomach rumble is actually noise from the intestines.

Surgery
In humans, many bariatric surgery procedures involve the stomach, in order to lose weight. A gastric band may be placed around the cardia area, which can adjust to limit intake. The anatomy of the stomach may be modified, or the stomach may be bypassed entirely.

Surgical removal of the stomach is called a gastrectomy, and removal of the cardia area is a called a cardiectomy.  "Cardiectomy" is a term that is also used to describe the removal of the heart. A gastrectomy may be carried out because of gastric cancer or severe perforation of the stomach wall.

Fundoplication is stomach surgery in which the fundus is wrapped around the lower esophagus and stitched into place.  It is used to treat gastroesophageal reflux disease (GERD).

History
There were previously conflicting statements in the academic anatomy community over whether the cardia is part of the stomach, part of the esophagus or a distinct entity. Modern surgical and medical textbooks have agreed that "the gastric cardia is now clearly considered to be part of the stomach."

Etymology
The word stomach is derived from the Latin  which has roots from the Greek word stomachos, ultimately from stoma, "mouth". Gastro- and gastric (meaning "related to the stomach") are both derived from the Greek word gaster (meaning "belly").

Other animals

Although the precise shape and size of the stomach varies widely among different vertebrates, the relative positions of the esophageal and duodenal openings remain relatively constant. As a result, the organ always curves somewhat to the left before curving back to meet the pyloric sphincter. However, lampreys, hagfishes, chimaeras, lungfishes, and some teleost fish have no stomach at all, with the esophagus opening directly into the intestine. These animals all consume diets that require little storage of food, no predigestion with gastric juices, or both.

The gastric lining is usually divided into two regions, an anterior portion lined by fundic glands and a posterior portion lined with pyloric glands. Cardiac glands are unique to mammals, and even then are absent in a number of species. The distributions of these glands vary between species, and do not always correspond with the same regions as in humans. Furthermore, in many non-human mammals, a portion of the stomach anterior to the cardiac glands is lined with epithelium essentially identical to that of the esophagus. Ruminants, in particular, have a complex stomach, the first three chambers of which are all lined with esophageal mucosa.

In birds and crocodilians, the stomach is divided into two regions. Anteriorly is a narrow tubular region, the proventriculus, lined by fundic glands, and connecting the true stomach to the crop. Beyond lies the powerful muscular gizzard, lined by pyloric glands, and, in some species, containing stones that the animal swallows to help grind up food.

In insects there is also a crop. The insect stomach is called the midgut.

Information about the stomach in echinoderms or molluscs can be found under the respective articles.

Additional images

See also 

 Gastroesophageal reflux disease
 Human gastrointestinal microbiota
 Proton-pump inhibitor

References

External links 

 Stomach at the Human Protein Atlas
 "Stomach" article from the Encyclopedia of Nursing & Allied Health, from enotes.com
 Digestion of proteins in the stomach or tiyan  (archived 10 March 2007)
  Site with details of how ruminants process food (archived 27 October 2009)
 Control of Gastric Emptying

 
Abdomen
Digestive system
Organs (anatomy)